John White (1634–1713) was an English politician.

He was the only son of Thomas White of Tuxford, Nottinghamshire and educated at Emmanuel College, Cambridge and Gray's Inn.

He was Member of Parliament for Nottinghamshire in 1679–1685, from May 1689 to 1690 and then finally from 1691 until 1698. He served on a number of committees.

He married Jane, the daughter of Sir Thomas Williamson, 1st Baronet of East Markham, Nottinghamshire. They had two sons.

References

1634 births
1713 deaths
English MPs 1679
English MPs 1680–1681
English MPs 1681
English MPs 1689–1690
English MPs 1690–1695
English MPs 1695–1698
Alumni of Emmanuel College, Cambridge
Members of Gray's Inn